Micaela Castain Serrano (born 11 February 1992) is a Puerto Rican international footballer who plays for the Puerto Rico national team.

Career
Castain was eligible to play for the United States or Puerto Rico, as she was born in Chicago to a Puerto Rican mother (her father is from California).

In July 2011, Castain was called up by the United States U-20 team for a training camp. Almost six years later, she committed her future to Puerto Rico.

Castain made a non-official debut for Puerto Rico on 22 April 2017, when she started against American college Notre Dame Fighting Irish. Officially, she debuted on 5 May 2018 against Anguilla. She was the top goalscorer for the Boricuas at the 2018 CONCACAF Women's Championship qualification, scoring five times.

In 2016, Castain joined the coaching staff at the University of Montana.

International goals
Scores and results list Puerto Rico's goal tally first

Personal life
Castain has a twin sister called Morgan, who played college soccer for Fresno State University. She retired because of injuries suffered and her professional commitments.

References 

1992 births
Living people
American sportspeople of Puerto Rican descent
Puerto Rican women's footballers
American women's soccer players
Soccer players from Chicago
Women's association football forwards
Washington State Cougars women's soccer players
Puerto Rico women's international footballers
Twin sportspeople
American twins
Montana Lady Griz soccer coaches